Manfred Sepse Lubowitz (born 21 October 1940), known professionally as Manfred Mann, is a South African-born keyboardist, arranger, singer and songwriter, resident in the UK since 1961. He is best known as a founding member of the bands Manfred Mann, Manfred Mann Chapter Three and Manfred Mann's Earth Band.

Early life and career
Lubowitz was raised in a Lithuanian-Jewish family in Johannesburg, the son of David Lubowitz and Alma Cohen. He studied music at the University of the Witwatersrand, and worked as a jazz pianist at a number of clubs in Johannesburg. 

Strongly opposed to the apartheid system in his native South Africa, Lubowitz moved to the United Kingdom in 1961 and began to write for Jazz News under the pseudonym Manfred Manne (after jazz drummer Shelly Manne), which was soon shortened to Manfred Mann. The next year he met drummer and keyboard player Mike Hugg at Clacton Butlins Holiday Camp; together they formed a large blues-jazz band called the Mann-Hugg Blues Brothers. This eventually evolved into a five-piece group, and they signed a record deal with EMI in 1963, under the HMV label. 

They changed their name to Manfred Mann at the suggestion of the label's record producer, and from 1964 to 1969 they had a succession of hit records, including "Do Wah Diddy Diddy" (originally by The Exciters), "Sha La La" (originally by The Shirelles), "Pretty Flamingo", and "Mighty Quinn" (written by Bob Dylan). The group split up in 1969, and Mann immediately formed another outfit with Mike Hugg; Manfred Mann Chapter Three, an experimental jazz rock band. They disbanded after two albums, but Mann formed a new outfit in 1971, Manfred Mann's Earth Band, which still records and performs to this day. Their well-known hits included three Springsteen covers, "Spirit in the Night", "For You" and "Blinded by the Light", as well as a number of covers of other artists, including "Runner" (Ian Thomas), "Davy's on the Road Again" (The Band), "You Angel You" (Bob Dylan), "Demolition Man" (The Police), "Lies (Through the '80s)" and "Joybringer" (based upon "Jupiter, the Bringer of Jollity" from The Planets by Gustav Holst.)

Manfred Mann also appeared as a jazz pianist in the 1969 Jesús Franco film Venus in Furs, and performed the score for that film. He has also released solo projects under "Manfred Mann's Plain Music" and "Manfred Mann '06".

Style
Mann has used various keyboard instruments through his career (piano and organ in the early 1960s, later also including mellotron), but he is especially known for his distinctive solo performance on the Minimoog synthesizer, which he personalized by extensive use of a filter. His keyboard parts are often improvised and inspired by jazz. One example, as he explained in an interview with eclipsed magazine, is his tendency to bend notes downwards on the synthesizer, which he says he got from Miles Davis.

In the 2000s, he has regularly used a Roland keytar on stage for two or three songs. The instrument is visually striking for being decorated with zebra stripes. In the early 1970s, he played drums during the intro of the song "Black and Blue" (see video).

Equipment 
By the early 1970s Mann used a Hammond M3 organ which he had acquired from Alan Price and then modified to give it a grittier sound. This instrument was the basis for his live keyboard setup in Chapter III as well as the classic Earth Band lineup until the late 1970s. For the Earth Band Mann added a Minimoog monophonic synthesizer to his setup which he had bought in the summer of 1971. By the mid-1970s he added a Fender Rhodes 73 Stage Piano to his setup. 

In the late 1970s and early 1980s he combined the Minimoog with an Oberheim SEM to expand the filter and effect section. At this point Mann used a considerably bigger live setup for which he had replaced the bulky Hammond M3 with a one-manual Korg CX-3 organ and added a Yamaha CP-70 for piano sounds as well as an ARP Omni for string sounds.

When digital keyboards became more common, Mann began replacing the bulky analogue instruments with them. In the early 1990s he used a Yamaha SY77 and a Korg M-1 together with the Minimoog. During the 1990s Mann also used a Yamaha VL 1.

By the early 2000s Mann had replaced the Minimoog with a new Minimoog Voyager for his live setup which he combined with a Korg Z1 for other sounds. In the 2010s he dropped the analogue Moog synthesizers from his live setup altogether and moved to a digital setup consisting of keyboards like the Roland V-Combo.

Mann has relied on effect pedals to achieve his keyboard sounds. When he was using an analogue setup he fed his Hammond organ into a MXR Phase 100 and his Rhodes into a MXR Phase 90. His lead sounds are often combined with distortion pedals and fuzz boxes, especially for studio recordings. In the 1970s Mann used an Echoplex tape delay with his Minimoog.

During the 1970s Mann used guitar amps to amplify his keyboard sounds. While the Hammond organ and Rhodes went into a 200 watts Highwatt half stack, the Minimoog was amplified using an Acoustic half stack, consisting of an Acoustic 270 amp and an Acoustic 271 cabinet.

Vocals 
Mann has mostly performed backing vocals in his music. On some of his albums, he doesn’t sing at all, and instead only provides keyboard/piano instrumentation, notably on his 2014 Lone Arranger album. Particularly during the first half of his career, he would sing lead vocals on about two songs on some albums. He performs as the lead vocalist on these songs:

 “One Way Glass" (1969 Chapter Three version)
 "Part Time Man", "I'm Up and I'm Leaving" (1972)
 "Earth, The Circle Part 1" (1973)
 the final verse of “Blinded by the Light” (1976)
 "Resurrection" and the middle part of "You Angel You" (1979)
 "Adolescent Dream" (1980) 
 "Brothers and Sisters of Azania", "Redemption Song" ("Brothers and Sisters" reprise), "Wardream", "Holiday's End" (1983)
 "Frog" (2004, spoken word)
 "Slogo" (2014, spoken word)

The lead vocalists on Mann’s albums can be seen in the album pages in the “Discography” section.

Discography
See Manfred Mann discography, Manfred Mann Chapter Three and Manfred Mann's Earth Band discography.
 Plains Music (1991) credited to Manfred Mann's Plains Music
 2006 (2004) credited to Manfred Mann '06 with Manfred Mann's Earth Band
 Lone Arranger (2014)

Guest work
Manfred Mann played a minimoog solo on the Uriah Heep song "July Morning". He also played keyboards on Trevor Rabin's album Wolf.

References

External links

 
 Manfred Mann's Earth Band Official Site

1940 births
Living people
British blues musicians
British jazz keyboardists
British jazz pianists
British record producers
British rhythm and blues boom musicians
British rock keyboardists
British rock pianists
Jewish British musicians
Jewish rock musicians
Keytarists
Manfred Mann members
Manfred Mann's Earth Band members
Musicians from Johannesburg
Musicians from London 
Progressive rock keyboardists
South African emigrants to the United Kingdom
South African jazz pianists
South African Jews
White South African people